The German invasion of the Low Countries included:
German invasion of the Netherlands
German invasion of Belgium
German invasion of Luxembourg